Blake Caldwell (born March 27, 1984, in Boulder, Colorado) is a former American road bicycle racer. In 2010 he stepped down from the higher level Team Garmin–Chipotle, for whom he had ridden since 2007, to race at a less competitive level while seeking to reverse the onset of osteoporosis.  He turned professional in 2005.  His only two professional wins have come in stages of the Tour of Utah: stage 6 in 2006, and the second stage in 2008.

External links

Blake Caldwell

References

1984 births
Living people
American male cyclists
Cyclists from Colorado